The BWF World Ranking is the official ranking of the Badminton World Federation for badminton players who participate in tournaments sanctioned by Badminton World Federation. It is used to determine the qualification for the World Championships and Summer Olympic Games, as well as BWF World Tour tournaments. Seedings of draws at all BWF-sanctioned tournaments are conducted using the BWF World Ranking.
Players under 19 years of age are eligible to rank in the BWF World Junior Ranking, which were introduced in January 2011. The following lists are the rankings:

Overview
The ranking points are awarded based on the level and progress of the tournament from each player/pair. Ranking points calculated are based on the tournaments each players/pairs participate in from the last 52 weeks. If a player or pair has participated in ten or fewer World Ranking tournaments, then the ranking is worked out by adding together the points won at tournaments in the last 52 weeks. If a player or pair has participated in 11 or more World Ranking tournaments, only the 10 highest points scored in the tournaments during the 52-week period count towards their ranking. The highest possible ranking points are 124,000 as of 2022 but will soon increase to 125,000 in 2023 with 4 Super 1000 Tournaments. Though the highest points ever achieved are 122,606 by Viktor Axelsen as ranking points were frozen from 2020–2022.

Points system 
Points system used are as follows:

April 1, 1995 – 29 January 2003 system 
1. The points system chart:

2. World Badminton Grand Prix Finals are ranked as 6* event, the points system is as follows:

30 January, 2003 – 31 December, 2006 system 
The points in the new system are multiplied by 10 from the previous one:

2007–2017 system 

 – At the Olympic Games, third place receives 9,200 points while fourth place receives 8,400 points.

2018–present system 
Since 2018, BWF has started a new system for counting points:

 – At the Olympic Games 3rd place will receive 10,100 points. Fourth place will receive 9,200 points.
 – From 2022, at the World Tour Finals' group stage 3rd place will receive 7,500 points. Fourth place will receive 6,600 points.

Player rankings 

Men's singles

Women's singles

Men's doubles

Women's doubles

Mixed doubles

World team rankings

Year-end number one players

Number one ranked players timeline

Last updated: 

NOTE: BWF froze the World Rankings from 18 March 2020 to 2 February 2021 due to the COVID-19 pandemic.

Men's singles

Women's singles

Men's doubles

Women's doubles 
{| class="sortable wikitable" style="font-size:90%; text-align:center" 
|-
! # !!  !! Player !! Date started !! Date ended !! Consecutiveweeks !! Totalweeks 
|-
| rowspan="2" | 1 ||  || align="left" | Zhao Tingting || align="left" rowspan="2" | 1 October 2009 || align="left" rowspan="2" | 4 November 2009 || rowspan="2" | 5 || rowspan="2" | 5 
|-
|  || align="left" | Zhang Yawen 
|-
| rowspan="2" | 2 ||  || align="left" | Cheng Shu || align="left" rowspan="2" | 5 November 2009 || align="left" rowspan="2" | 18 November 2009 || rowspan="2" | 2 || rowspan="2" | 2 
|-
|  || align="left" | Zhao Yunlei 
|-
| rowspan="2" | 3 ||  || align="left" | Du Jing || align="left" rowspan="2" | 19 November 2009 || align="left" rowspan="2" | 25 November 2009 || rowspan="2" | 1 || rowspan="2" | (1) 
|-
|  || align="left" | Yu Yang 
|-
| rowspan="2" | 4 ||  || align="left" | Ma Jin || align="left" rowspan="2" | 26 November 2009 || align="left" rowspan="2" | 27 January 2010 || rowspan="2" | 9 || rowspan="2" | (9) 
|-
|  || align="left" | Wang Xiaoli 
|-
| rowspan="2" |  ||  || align="left" | Du Jing || align="left" rowspan="2" | 28 January 2010 || align="left" rowspan="2" | 24 March 2010 || rowspan="2" | 8 || rowspan="2" | 9 
|-
|  || align="left" | Yu Yang 
|-
| rowspan="2" |  ||  || align="left" | Ma Jin || align="left" rowspan="2" | 25 March 2010 || align="left" rowspan="2" | 29 September 2010 || rowspan="2" | 27 || rowspan="2" | 36 
|-
|  || align="left" | Wang Xiaoli 
|-
| rowspan="2" | 5 ||  || align="left" | Cheng Wen-hsing || align="left" rowspan="2" | 30 September 2010 || align="left" rowspan="2" | 27 April 2011 || rowspan="2" | 30 || rowspan="2" | 30 
|-
|  || align="left" | Chien Yu-chin 
|-
| rowspan="2" | 6 ||  || align="left" | Wang Xiaoli || align="left" rowspan="2" | 28 April 2011 || align="left" rowspan="2" | 19 September 2012 || rowspan="2" | 73 || rowspan="2" | (73) 
|-
|  || align="left" | Yu Yang 
|-
| rowspan="2" | 7 ||  || align="left" | Tian Qing || align="left" rowspan="2" | 20 September 2012 || align="left" rowspan="2" | 13 March 2013 || rowspan="2" | 25 || rowspan="2" | (25) 
|-
|  || align="left" | Zhao Yunlei 
|-
| rowspan="2" |  ||  || align="left" | Wang Xiaoli || align="left" rowspan="2" | 14 March 2013 || align="left" rowspan="2" | 28 May 2014 || rowspan="2" | 63 || bgcolor="#ccffcc" rowspan="2" | 136 
|-
|  || align="left" | Yu Yang 
|-
| rowspan="2" | 8 ||  || align="left" | Bao Yixin || align="left" rowspan="2" | 29 May 2014 || align="left" rowspan="2" | 29 October 2014 || rowspan="2" | 22 || rowspan="2" | 22 
|-
|  || align="left" | Tang Jinhua 
|-
| rowspan="2" | 9 ||  || align="left" | Misaki Matsutomo || align="left" rowspan="2" | 30 October 2014 || align="left" rowspan="2" | 26 November 2014 || rowspan="2" | 4 || rowspan="2" | (4) 
|-
|  || align="left" | Ayaka Takahashi 
|-
| rowspan="2" |  ||  || align="left" | Tian Qing || align="left" rowspan="2" | 27 November 2014 || align="left" rowspan="2" | 1 April 2015 || rowspan="2" | 18 || rowspan="2" | 43 
|-
|  || align="left" | Zhao Yunlei 
|-
| rowspan="2" |  ||  || align="left" | Misaki Matsutomo || align="left" rowspan="2" | 2 April 2015 || align="left" rowspan="2" | 16 December 2015 || rowspan="2" | 37 || rowspan="2" | (41) 
|-
|  || align="left" | Ayaka Takahashi 
|-
| rowspan="2" | 10 ||  || align="left" | Luo Ying || align="left" rowspan="2" | 17 December 2015 || align="left" rowspan="2" | 16 March 2016 || rowspan="2" | 13 || rowspan="2" | 13 
|-
|  || align="left" | Luo Yu 
|-
| rowspan="2" |  ||  || align="left" | Misaki Matsutomo || align="left" rowspan="2" | 17 March 2016 || align="left" rowspan="2" | 25 October 2017 || bgcolor="#ccffcc" rowspan="2" | 84 || rowspan="2" | (125) 
|-
|  || align="left" | Ayaka Takahashi 
|-
| rowspan="2" | 11 || bgcolor="#FFFACD" |  || align="left" bgcolor="#FFFACD" | Chen Qingchen || align="left" rowspan="2" | 26 October 2017 || align="left" rowspan="2" | 8 November 2017 || rowspan="2" | 2 || rowspan="2" | (2) 
|-
| bgcolor="#FFFACD" |  || align="left" bgcolor="#FFFACD" | Jia Yifan 
|-
| rowspan="2" |  ||  || align="left" | Misaki Matsutomo || align="left" rowspan="2" | 9 November 2017 || align="left" rowspan="2" | 22 November 2017 || rowspan="2" | 2 || rowspan="2" | 127 
|-
|  || align="left" | Ayaka Takahashi 
|-
| rowspan="2" |  || bgcolor="#FFFACD" |  || align="left" bgcolor="#FFFACD" | Chen Qingchen || align="left" rowspan="2" | 23 November 2017 || align="left" rowspan="2" | 20 June 2018 || rowspan="2" | 30 || rowspan="2" | (32) 
|-
| bgcolor="#FFFACD" |  || align="left" bgcolor="#FFFACD" | Jia Yifan 
|-
| rowspan="2" | 12 || bgcolor="#FFFACD" |  || align="left" bgcolor="#FFFACD" | Yuki Fukushima || align="left" rowspan="2" | 21 June 2018 || align="left" rowspan="2" | 4 July 2018 || rowspan="2" | 2 || rowspan="2" | (2) 
|-
| bgcolor="#FFFACD" |  || align="left" bgcolor="#FFFACD" | Sayaka Hirota 
|-
| rowspan="2" |  || bgcolor="#FFFACD" |  || align="left" bgcolor="#FFFACD" | Chen Qingchen || align="left" rowspan="2" | 5 July 2018 || align="left" rowspan="2" | 8 August 2018 || rowspan="2" | 5 || rowspan="2" | (37)
|-
| bgcolor="#FFFACD" |  || align="left" bgcolor="#FFFACD" | Jia Yifan 
|-
| rowspan="2" |  || bgcolor="#FFFACD" |  || align="left" bgcolor="#FFFACD" | Yuki Fukushima || align="left" rowspan="2" | 9 August 2018 || align="left" rowspan="2" | 29 April 2019 || rowspan="2" | 38 || rowspan="2" | (40)
|-
| bgcolor="#FFFACD" |  || align="left" bgcolor="#FFFACD" | Sayaka Hirota 
|-
| rowspan="2" | 13 || bgcolor="#FFFACD" |  || align="left" bgcolor="#FFFACD" | Mayu Matsumoto || align="left" rowspan="2" | 30 April 2019 || align="left" rowspan="2" | 22 July 2019 || rowspan="2" | 12 || rowspan="2" | (12)
|-
| bgcolor="#FFFACD" |  || align="left" bgcolor="#FFFACD" | Wakana Nagahara
|-
| rowspan="2" |  || bgcolor="#FFFACD" |  || align="left" bgcolor="#FFFACD" | Yuki Fukushima || align="left" rowspan="2" | 23 July 2019 || align="left" rowspan="2" | 29 July 2019 || rowspan="2" | 1 || rowspan="2" | (41) 
|-
| bgcolor="#FFFACD" |  || align="left" bgcolor="#FFFACD" | Sayaka Hirota
|-
| rowspan="2" |  || bgcolor="#FFFACD" |  || align="left" bgcolor="#FFFACD" | Mayu Matsumoto || align="left" rowspan="2" | 30 July 2019 || align="left" rowspan="2" | 11 November 2019 || rowspan="2" | 15 || rowspan="2" | 27 
|-
| bgcolor="#FFFACD" |  || align="left" bgcolor="#FFFACD" | Wakana Nagahara
|-
| rowspan="2" |  || bgcolor="#FFFACD" |  || align="left" bgcolor="#FFFACD" | Yuki Fukushima || align="left" rowspan="2" | 12 November 2019 || align="left" rowspan="2" | 18 November 2019 || rowspan="2" | 1 || rowspan="2" | (42) 
|-
| bgcolor="#FFFACD" |  || align="left" bgcolor="#FFFACD" | Sayaka Hirota
|-
| rowspan="2" |  || bgcolor="#FFFACD" |  || align="left" bgcolor="#FFFACD" | Chen Qingchen || align="left" rowspan="2" | 19 November 2019 || align="left" rowspan="2" | 1 February 2021 || rowspan="2" | 18 || rowspan="2" | (55)
|-
| bgcolor="#FFFACD" |  || align="left" bgcolor="#FFFACD" | Jia Yifan
|-
| rowspan="2" |  || bgcolor="#FFFACD" |  || align="left" bgcolor="#FFFACD" | Yuki Fukushima || align="left" rowspan="2" | 2 February 2021 || align="left" rowspan="2" | 20 December 2021 || rowspan="2" | 46 || rowspan="2" | 88
|-
| bgcolor="#FFFACD" |  || align="left" bgcolor="#FFFACD" | Sayaka Hirota
|-
| rowspan="2" |  || bgcolor="#FFFACD" |  || align="left" bgcolor="FFFACD" | Chen Qingchen || align="left" rowspan="2" | 21 December 2021 || align="left" rowspan="2" | 3 October 2022 || rowspan="2" | 41 || rowspan="2" | 96
|-
| bgcolor="FFFACD" |  || align="left" bgcolor="FFFACD" | Jia Yifan
|-
| rowspan="2" | 14 || bgcolor="#FFFACD" |  || align="left" bgcolor="FFFACD" | Kim So-yeong || align="left" rowspan="2" | 4 October 2022 || align="left" rowspan="2" | 18 October 2022 || rowspan="2" | 3 || rowspan="2" | 3|-
| bgcolor="FFFACD" |  || align="left" bgcolor="FFFACD" | Kong Hee-yong
|-
| rowspan="2" |  || bgcolor="#FFFACD" |  || align="left" bgcolor="FFFACD" | Chen Qingchen || align="left" rowspan="2" | 25 October 2022 || align="left" rowspan="2" |  || rowspan="2" | 14 || rowspan="2" | 110|-
| bgcolor="FFFACD" |  || align="left" bgcolor="FFFACD" | Jia Yifan'|-
|}

 Mixed doubles 

 Players with highest career rank 2–5 Last update: 24 January 2023''

The following is a list of players who were ranked world no. 5 or higher but not no. 1 in the period since the introduction of the BWF computer rankings (active players in ):

Men's singles

Women's singles

Men's doubles

Women's doubles

Mixed doubles

References

Ranking
Badminton records and statistics
Sports world rankings